Australian International Film Corporation was an Australian film production company set up in 1977. It was a wholly owned subsidiary of Filmways Australia and one of the shareholders was producer Antony I. Ginnane.

References

External links
Company page at Screen Australia
Company page at Australian Screen Online
Company page at BFI
Film production companies of Australia